The year 1972 in film involved several significant events.

Highest-grossing films (U.S.)

The top ten 1972 released films by box office gross in North America are as follows:

Awards 

Palme d'Or (Cannes Film Festival):
The Working Class Goes to Heaven (La classe operaia va in paradiso), directed by Elio Petri, Italy
The Mattei Affair (Il Caso Mattei), directed by Francesco Rosi, Italy

Golden Bear (Berlin Film Festival):
The Canterbury Tales (I Racconti di Canterbury), directed by Pier Paolo Pasolini, Italy / France

1972 Wide-release movies
United States unless stated

January–March

April–June

July–September

October–December

Notable films released in 1972
United States unless stated

#
The 14 Amazons (Shi si nu ying hao), directed by Cheng Kang, starring Lisa Lu, Lily Ho, Ivy Ling Po. (Hong Kong historical drama martial arts film)
1776, starring William Daniels, Howard Da Silva, John Cullum, Ken Howard, Blythe Danner

A
Across 110th Street, starring Anthony Quinn and Yaphet Kotto
The Adventures of Barry McKenzie, directed by Bruce Beresford, starring Barry Crocker, Barry Humphries, Peter Cook, Spike Milligan – (Australia)
Aguirre, the Wrath of God (Aguirre, der Zorn Gottes), directed by Werner Herzog, starring Klaus Kinski- (West Germany)
The Amazing Mr. Blunden, starring Laurence Naismith and Lynne Frederick – (U.K.)
And Now For Something Completely Different, the first film made by the British comedy troupe Monty Python – (U.K.)Angry Guest (E ke), directed by Chang Cheh – (Hong Kong)Another Nice Mess, starring Rich LittleAntony and Cleopatra, directed by and starring Charlton Heston, with Hildegarde Neil – (U.K.)Apna Desh (Our Country), starring Rajesh Khanna and Mumtaz – (India)The Assassination of Trotsky, starring Richard Burton and Alain Delon – (Italy)Asylum, starring Britt Ekland, Barbara Parkins, Charlotte Rampling, Peter Cushing, Barry MorseAvanti!, directed by Billy Wilder, starring Jack Lemmon and Juliet Mills

BBad Company, directed by Robert Benton, starring Jeff Bridges and Barry BrownBaharo Phool Barsao – (Pakistan)Baron Blood (Gli orrori del castello di Norimberga), directed by Mario Bava, starring Joseph Cotten and Elke Sommer – (Italy)Bawarchi (The Chef), starring Rajesh Khanna – (India)Be-Imaan – (India)Ben, starring Lee MontgomeryThe Big Bird Cage, starring Pam GrierThe Bitter Tears of Petra von Kant (Die Bitteren Tränen der Petra von Kant), directed by Rainer Werner Fassbinder, starring Hanna Schygulla – (West Germany)Black GunnBlacula, starring William Marshall and Vonetta McGeeBlanche, directed by Walerian Borowczyk, starring Michel Simon, Georges Wilson, Jacques Perrin, Ligia Branice – (France)Bluebeard, directed by Edward Dmytryk, starring Richard Burton, Joey Heatherton, Raquel Welch, Virna Lisi, Sybil DanningBone, starring Yaphet KottoBoxcar Bertha, directed by Martin Scorsese, starring Barbara Hershey and David CarradineThe Boy Turns Man (Momcheto si otiva), directed by Lyudmil Kirkov, starring Nevena Kokanova, Kiril Gospodinov, Sashka Bratanova – (Bulgaria)Brother Sun, Sister Moon (Fratello Sole, Sorella Luna), directed by Franco Zeffirelli – (Italy/U.K.)Buck and the Preacher, directed by and starring Sidney Poitier, with Harry Belafonte and Ruby DeeButterflies Are Free, starring Goldie Hawn, Edward Albert, Eileen Heckart (Academy Award for Best Supporting Actress)

CCabaret, directed by Bob Fosse, starring Liza Minnelli, Michael York, Joel Grey – 8 Academy Awards, including Best Director, Best Actress and Best Supporting ActorThe Candidate, directed by Michael Ritchie, starring Robert Redford, Peter Boyle, Melvyn DouglasThe Canterbury Tales (I racconti di Canterbury), by Pier Paolo Pasolini, starring Hugh Griffith – Golden Bear winner – (Italy)The Carey Treatment, directed by Blake Edwards, starring James Coburn and Jennifer O'NeillCarry On Matron, starring Sid James, Kenneth Williams, Hattie Jacques – (U.K.)The Castle of Purity (El castillo de la pureza) – (Mexico)Cats' Play (Macskajáték) – (Hungary)Chato's Land, starring Charles Bronson, Jack Palance, James Whitmore, Richard Basehart, Ralph WaiteChild's Play, directed by Sidney Lumet, starring James Mason, Robert Preston, Beau BridgesCisco Pike, starring Kris Kristofferson, Karen Black, Gene HackmanCome Back, Charleston Blue, starring Godfrey Cambridge and Raymond St. JacquesConquest of the Planet of the Apes, starring Roddy McDowall, Ricardo Montalbán, Natalie Trundy, Don MurrayCorky, starring Robert Blake and Charlotte RamplingThe Cowboys, directed by Mark Rydell, starring John Wayne, Roscoe Lee Browne, Bruce DernCries and Whispers (Viskningar och rop), directed by Ingmar Bergman, starring Harriet Andersson, Ingrid Thulin, Liv Ullmann – (Sweden)The Cruel Sea (Bas ya Bahar) – (Kuwait)The Culpepper Cattle Co., directed by Dick Richards, starring Gary GrimesCu mâinile curate (With Clean Hands) – (Romania)

DDaigoro vs. Goliath – (Japan)Daughters of Satan, starring Tom SelleckThe Dawns Here Are Quiet – (U.S.S.R.)A Day in the Death of Joe Egg, starring Alan Bates – (U.K.)Days of '36, directed by Theodoros Angelopoulos
 The Dagger – drama romance film directed by Fereydun Gole (Iran)Deep Throat, – adult film directed by Gerard DamianoDeliverance, directed by John Boorman, starring Jon Voight, Burt Reynolds, Ned Beatty, Ronny CoxDirty Little Billy, starring Michael J. PollardThe Discreet Charm of the Bourgeoisie, directed by Luis Buñuel, starring Fernando Rey, Delphine Seyrig, Stephane Audran – Oscar for Best Foreign Language Film – (France)Don't Torture a Duckling (Non si sevizia un paperino) – (Italy)Dr. Jekyll y el Hombre Lobo (Dr. Jekyll and the Wolfman), starring Paul Naschy – (Spain)Dr. Phibes Rises Again, starring Vincent Price and Robert Quarry – (U.K.)Dynamite Chicken, starring Richard Pryor

EEagle in a Cage, starring John Gielgud, Ralph Richardson, Billie Whitelaw, Kenneth HaighThe Effect of Gamma Rays on Man-in-the-Moon Marigolds, directed by Paul Newman, starring Joanne WoodwardEndless Night, directed by Sidney Gilliat, starring Hayley Mills, Hywel Bennett, Britt Ekland – (U.K.)Everything You Always Wanted to Know About Sex, directed by and starring Woody Allen, with Gene Wilder, Lynn Redgrave, Louise Lasser, Lou Jacobi, Heather MacRae, Tony Randall, Burt Reynolds

FFat City, directed by John Huston, starring Stacy Keach, Jeff Bridges, Susan TyrrellFata Morgana, directed by Werner Herzog – (West Germany)Fear in the Night, starring Judy Geeson, Ralph Bates, Peter Cushing and Joan Collins- (U.K.)Featureless Men, directed by Mahmoud Zulfikar, starring Salah Zulfikar and Nadia Lutfi - (Egypt)Fellini's Roma, directed by Federico Fellini – (Italy)Fillmore, a music documentary film featuring Santana, Grateful Dead, Jefferson AirplaneThe Final Comedown, starring Billy Dee WilliamsFist of Fury (Jīng Wǔ Mén), starring Bruce Lee – (Hong Kong)Un flic (A Cop), directed by Jean-Pierre Melville, starring Alain Delon and Catherine Deneuve – (France)Follow Me!, starring Mia FarrowFrenzy, directed by Alfred Hitchcock, starring Jon Finch, Alec McCowen, Barry Foster, Anna Massey – (U.K.)Fritz the Cat, directed by Ralph Bakshi — first animated movie to receive an X ratingFrogs, directed by George McCowan, starring Ray Milland, Sam Elliott, Joan Van Ark Fuzz, starring Burt Reynolds, Yul Brynner and Raquel Welch

GGame of Death, starring Bruce Lee and Kareem Abdul-Jabbar – (Hong Kong/United States)Gentlemen of Fortune (Dzhentlmeny udachi) – (U.S.S.R.)The Getaway, directed by Sam Peckinpah, starring Steve McQueen, Ali MacGraw, Ben Johnson, Al Lettieri, Sally Struthers, Jack Dodson, Slim PickensThe Girl on the Broomstick (Dívka na koštěti) – (Czechoslovakia)Glastonbury Fayre, directed by Nicolas Roeg and Peter Neal, featuring Family, Fairport Convention, Traffic and more – (U.K.)The Goalkeeper's Fear of the Penalty (Die Angst des Tormanns beim Elfmeter), directed by Wim Wenders – (West Germany)The Goat Horn (Koziyat rog) – (Bulgaria)The Godfather, directed by Francis Ford Coppola, starring Marlon Brando, Al Pacino, James Caan, Diane Keaton, Robert Duvall, John Cazale, Richard Castellano, Talia Shire, Gianni Russo, Richard Conte, John Marley, Alex Rocco, Al Lettieri, Sterling Hayden – Academy Awards for Best Picture and Best ActorGodzilla vs. Gigan, directed by Jun Fukuda – (Japan)The Great Northfield Minnesota Raid, starring Cliff Robertson and Robert DuvallThe Groundstar Conspiracy, starring George Peppard

HHammersmith Is Out, directed by and starring Peter Ustinov, with Elizabeth Taylor, Richard Burton, Beau BridgesThe Harder They Come, starring Jimmy Cliff – (Jamaica)The Heartbreak Kid, directed by Elaine May, starring Charles Grodin, Jeannie Berlin, Cybill Shepherd, Eddie AlbertHellé, directed by Roger Vadim – (France)Henry VIII and His Six Wives, starring Keith Michell, Charlotte Rampling, Jane Asher – (U.K.)Her Third (Der Dritte) – (East Germany)Hickey & Boggs, starring Robert Culp and Bill CosbyHit Man, starring Bernie Casey and Pam GrierThe Hot Rock, directed by Peter Yates, starring Robert Redford, George Segal, Ron Leibman, Zero MostelThe Hound of the Baskervilles, a Sherlock Holmes mystery directed by Barry Crane, starring Stewart Granger as Sherlock Holmes and Bernard Fox as Watson, co-starring William Shatner

IImages, directed by Robert Altman, starring Susannah York – (US/UK)Intimate Confessions of a Chinese Courtesan (Ai Nu) – (Hong Kong film) directed by Chor YuenInsect Woman (Chungnyeo) – (South Korea)

JJ. W. Coop, starring Cliff RobertsonJoão and the Knife (João e a faca) – (Brazil)Jeremiah Johnson, directed by Sydney Pollack, starring Robert RedfordJoe Kidd, directed by John Sturges, starring Clint Eastwood, Robert Duvall, John SaxonJunior Bonner, directed by Sam Peckinpah, starring Steve McQueen, Robert Preston, Ida Lupino, Joe Don Baker

KKansas City Bomber, starring Raquel WelchThe King of Marvin Gardens, directed by Bob Rafelson, starring Jack Nicholson, Bruce Dern, Ellen BurstynKoshish, starring Sanjeev Kumar – (India)

LLady Caroline Lamb, directed by Robert Bolt, starring Sarah Miles, Richard Chamberlain, Laurence Olivier – (U.K.)Lady Liberty (La Mortadella), starring Sophia Loren and William Devane – (Italy)Lady Sings the Blues, biopic of Billie Holiday, directed by Sidney J. Furie, starring Diana Ross, Billy Dee Williams, Richard PryorThe Last House on the Left, directed by Wes Craven, starring Sandra Cassel, Lucy Grantham, David A. HessLast Tango in Paris (Ultimo tango a Parigi), directed by Bernardo Bertolucci, starring Marlon Brando and Maria Schneider – (France/Italy)The Legend of Nigger Charley, starring Fred WilliamsonThe Life and Times of Judge Roy Bean, directed by John Huston, starring Paul Newman, Anthony Perkins, Ava Gardner, Roddy McDowall, Victoria PrincipalLimbo, directed by Mark Robson, starring Kate JacksonLone Wolf and Cub: Sword of Vengeance (Kozure Ōkami: Kowokashi udekashi tsukamatsuru) – (Japan)Los Amigos (AKA Deaf Smith & Johnny Ears), starring Anthony Quinn and Franco Nero – (Italy/U.S.)Love in the Afternoon (L'Amour l'après-midi), directed by Éric Rohmer, starring Zouzou – (France)Ludwig, directed by Luchino Visconti, starring Helmut Berger, Trevor Howard, Silvana Mangano – (Italy/France)Ludwig: Requiem for a Virgin King, directed by Hans-Jürgen Syberberg, starring Harry Baer – (West Germany)

MThe Man, TV movie written by Rod Serling, starring James Earl Jones, Burgess Meredith, William Windom, Georg Stanford Brown, Jack BennyMan of La Mancha, starring Peter O'Toole, Sophia Loren, James Coco – (U.S./Italy)The Man Who Quit Smoking (Mannen som slutade röka) – (Sweden)Manhunt (La mala ordina), starring Henry Silva – (Italy)The Master Touch starring Kirk Douglas- (Italy)The Mattei Affair, directed by Francesco Rosi, starring Gian Maria Volonté – Palme d'Or winner – (Italy)The Mechanic, starring Charles BronsonMehdi in Black and Hot Mini Pants, starring Naser Malek Motiee and Hamideh Kheirabadi (Iran)Metzitzim (Peeping Toms) – (Israel)Moon of the Wolf, starring David Janssen and Bradford DillmanMutiny on the Buses, starring Reg Varney – (U.K.)My Dearest señorita (Mi querida señorita) – (Spain)My Name Is Shanghai Joe, starring Klaus Kinski and Chen Lee – (Italy)

NNapoleon and Samantha, starring Michael Douglas and Jodie FosterThe New Centurions, starring George C. Scott and Stacy KeachThe New Land (Nybyggarna), directed by Jan Troell, starring Max von Sydow and Liv Ullmann – Golden Globe Award for Best Foreign Film – (Sweden)Nidhanaya (The Treasure) – (Sri Lanka)Night of the Lepus, starring Janet Leigh, Stuart Whitman, Rory Calhoun, Deforest KelleyThe Night Stalker, TV movie starring Darren McGavin, Simon Oakland, Carol Lynley, Claude Akins. Ralph Meeker, Kent Smith, Charles McGraw, Larry Linville, Barry AtwaterNow You See Him, Now You Don't, starring Kurt Russell

OThe Offence, directed by Sidney Lumet, starring Sean Connery and Trevor Howard – (UK/US)One Day, the Nile, directed by Youssef Chahine, starring Salah Zulfikar and Soad Hosny - (Egypt)One Is a Lonely Number, starring Trish Van DevereThe Other, starring Diana MuldaurThe Other Side of the Underneath, starring Sheila Allen – (U.K.)The Outside Man (Un homme est mort), starring Jean-Louis Trintignant, Ann-Margret, Angie Dickinson – (France)Oyster Village (Seokhwachon) – (South Korea)

PPancho Villa, starring Telly Savalas, Clint Walker, Chuck Connors, Anne FrancisParis and Love, starring Salah Zulfikar and Sabah – (Lebanon)Pearl in the Crown (Perła w koronie) – (Poland)Pete 'n' Tillie, directed by Martin Ritt, starring Walter Matthau, Carol Burnett, Geraldine Page, Rene Auberjonois, Barry NelsonPink Flamingos, directed by John Waters, starring DivinePink Floyd: Live at Pompeii, directed by Adrian Maben, starring Roger Waters, David Gilmour, Richard Wright, Nick MasonPlay It Again, Sam, directed by Herbert Ross, starring Woody Allen, Diane Keaton, Tony RobertsPlay It as It Lays, directed by Frank Perry, starring Tuesday Weld and Anthony PerkinsPocket Money, directed by Stuart Rosenberg, starring Paul Newman and Lee MarvinPope Joan, starring Liv Ullmann, Olivia de Havilland, Franco NeroThe Poseidon Adventure, directed by Ronald Neame, starring Gene Hackman, Ernest Borgnine, Shelley Winters, Red Buttons, Carol Lynley, Stella Stevens, Jack Albertson, Roddy McDowall, Arthur O'Connell, Pamela Sue Martin, Eric Shea, Leslie Nielsen, Byron WebsterThe Possession of Joel Delaney, starring Shirley MacLaine and Perry KingPrime Cut, starring Lee Marvin and Gene HackmanPrivate Parts, directed by Paul BartelPulp, starring Michael Caine – (U.K.)

RRage, starring George C. Scott and Martin SheenRaja Jani, starring Dharmendra – (India)A Reason to Live, a Reason to Die, starring James Coburn and Telly Savalas – (Italy)Red Psalm (Még kér a nép), directed by Miklós Jancsó – (Hungary)The Revengers, starring William Holden and Ernest BorgnineThe Rowdyman, starring Gordon Pinsent – (Canada)The Ruling Class, starring Peter O'Toole and Alastair Sim – (U.K.)

SThe Salzburg Connection, starring Barry Newman, Anna Karina, Klaus Maria BrandauerSavage Messiah, directed by Ken Russell – (U.K.)Sbatti il mostro in prima pagina (Slam the Monster on the Frontpage), starring Gian Maria Volonté – (Italy)The Scientific Cardplayer (Lo Scopone Scientifico), starring Bette Davis, Alberto Sordi and Silvana Mangano – (Italy)The Seduction of Mimi (Mimí metallurgico ferito nell'onore), starring Mariangela Melato – (Italy)Shaft's Big Score, starring Richard Roundtree and Moses GunnSilent Running, starring Bruce DernSitting Target, starring Oliver Reed, Ian McShane and Jill St. John – (U.K.)Skyjacked, starring Charlton Heston, Yvette Mimieux, James Brolin, Jeanne Crain, Walter PidgeonSlaughter, starring Jim Brown, Stella Stevens, Rip TornSlaughterhouse-Five, directed by George Roy Hill, starring Michael Sacks, Ron Leibman, Valerie PerrineSleuth, directed by Joseph L. Mankiewicz, starring Laurence Olivier and Michael Caine – (US/UK)Snoopy, Come HomeSolaris, directed by Andrei Tarkovsky, starring Natalya Bondarchuk – (U.S.S.R.)Something to Hide, starring Peter Finch and Shelley WintersSounder, directed by Martin Ritt, starring Cicely Tyson and Paul WinfieldState of Siege (État de Siège), directed by Costa-Gavras, starring Yves Montand – (France)Steptoe and Son, starred Wilfrid Brambell and Harry H. Corbett – (U.K.)Stigma, directed by David E. Durston, starring Philip Michael ThomasStreet Mobster (Gendai yakuza: hito-kiri yota) – (Japan)Super Fly, directed by Gordon Parks, Jr., starring Ron O'Neal

TTabi no Omosa (Journey into Solitude) – (Japan)Tales from the Crypt, starring Peter Cushing and Joan Collins – (U.K.)The Tall Blond Man with One Black Shoe (Le Grand Blond avec une chaussure noire) – (France)Taming of the Fire – (U.S.S.R.)They Only Kill Their Masters, starring James Garner and Katharine RossThe Thing with Two Heads, starring Ray Milland and Rosey GrierThose People of the Nile, directed by Youssef Chahine, starring Salah Zulfikar and Soad Hosny – (Egypt - Soviet Union)To Find a Man, starring Pamela Sue Martin, Tom Bosley, Tom Ewell, Phyllis NewmanTomorrow, starring Robert DuvallTonta, tonta, pero no tanto (Foolish, Foolish, but not that Much) – (Mexico)Tout Va Bien (Everything's Fine), directed by Jean-Luc Godard, starring Jane Fonda and Yves Montand – (France/Italy)Travels with My Aunt, starring Maggie SmithTreasure Island, starring Orson Welles – (France/Germany/Spain/US)Trick Baby, starring Kiel Martin and Mel StewartThe Triple Echo, directed by Michael Apted, starring Glenda Jackson and Oliver Reed – (U.K.)Trouble Man, directed by Ivan Dixon, starring Robert Hooks and Paul Winfield

UUlzana's Raid, directed by Robert Aldrich, starring Burt LancasterUnder Milk Wood, starring Richard Burton, Elizabeth Taylor, Peter O'Toole – (U.K.)Under the Flag of the Rising Sun – (Japan)Une belle fille comme moi (a.k.a. Such a Gorgeous Kid Like Me), directed by François Truffaut – (France)

VThe Valachi Papers, starring Charles Bronson and Lino Ventura – (Italy/France)La Vallée, directed by Barbet Schroeder, starring Bulle Ogier with music by Pink Floyd – (France)Vampire Circus, starring Adrienne Corri and Anthony Higgins – (U.K.)Victoria No. 203 – (India)The Visitors, directed by Elia Kazan

WThe War Between Men and Women starring Jack Lemmon and Barbara HarrisThe Water Margin (Shui hu zhuan), directed by Chang Cheh – (Hong Kong)Way of the Dragon (Meng long guo jiang), directed by and starring Bruce Lee with Nora Miao and Chuck Norris – (Hong Kong)We Won't Grow Old Together (Nous ne vieillirons pas ensemble) – (France)The Wedding (Wesele), directed by Andrzej Wajda – (Poland)What's Up, Doc?, directed by Peter Bogdanovich, starring Barbra Streisand and Ryan O'NealWhen the Gods Fall Asleep (Quando os Deuses Adormecem) – (Brazil)Where Does It Hurt?  starring Peter SellersWinter Soldier, a documentary made by Vietnam Veterans Against the WarThe Wrath of God, starring Robert Mitchum, Rita Hayworth, Frank Langella

XX, Y, and Zee, aka Zee and Co., starring Elizabeth Taylor, Michael Caine, Susannah York

YYou'll Like My Mother, starring Patty DukeYoung Winston, biopic of Winston Churchill, directed by Richard Attenborough, starring Simon Ward, Robert Shaw, Anne Bancroft – (U.K.)

Births
January 5 - Luciana Pedraza, Argentine actress and director
January 9 – Deon Cole, American actor
January 11 – Amanda Peet, American actress
January 12 - Zabryna Guevara, American actress
January 15 – Kobe Tai, Taiwanese-American adult and mainstream actress
January 20 - Adrian Martinez (actor), American actor and comedian
January 22 - Romi Park, Japanese actress and singer
January 23 - Ewen Bremner, Scottish character actor
January 26 - Cyia Batten, American dancer, model and actress
January 28 - Peter McDonald (actor), Irish actor and director
February 1 - Tego Calderón, Puerto Rican rapper, singer and actor
February 7 - Robyn Lively, American actress
February 9 – Crispin Freeman, American voice actor
February 16 - Sarah Clarke, American actress
February 20 – Gareth Unwin, English producer
February 26 – Keith Ferguson, American voice actor
February 27 - Richard Coyle, English actor
March 4 – Garth Jennings, English film director, screenwriter, producer, actor and writer
March 9
Jean Louisa Kelly, American actress and singer
Kerr Smith, American actor
March 13 – Common, American actor and singer
March 18 – Dane Cook, American comedian
March 23 – Judith Godrèche, French actress
March 24
Charlie Creed-Miles, English actor and musician
Tony Leondis, Greek-American animator, filmmaker and voice actor
March 26 – Leslie Mann, American actress
March 28 – Nick Frost, English actor, comedian, writer and producer
March 31 – Alejandro Amenábar, Spanish director, writer and soundtrack composer
April 3 - Catherine McCormack, English actress
April 5 - Junko Takeuchi, Japanese actress and voice actress
April 6 - Jason Hervey, American actor and producer
April 8 - Sung Kang, American actor
April 15 - Lou Romano, American animator and voice actor
April 17 – Jennifer Garner, American actress
April 18 - Eli Roth, American director, screenwriter, producer and actor
April 20 - Carmen Electra, American actress, singer and model
April 26 - Bronagh Gallagher, Irish actress and singer
April 28 - Gabriel Casseus, American actor ands screenwriter
April 29 – Derek Mears, American actor and stuntman
May 2 – Dwayne Johnson, American actor
May 7 - Jennifer Yuh Nelson, South Korean-born American story artist and director
May 12 - Christian Campbell, Canadian actor
May 14 - Gabriel Mann, American actor and model
May 20 - Busta Rhymes, American rapper and actor
May 22 - Max Brooks, American actor
May 25 - Karan Johar, Indian director
May 28
Kate Ashfield, English actress
Chiara Mastroianni, French actress
May 31 - Archie Panjabi, British actress
June 2 - Wayne Brady, American actor, comedian, producer, game show host, television personality and presenter
June 7 – Karl Urban, New Zealand actor
June 19 
Jean Dujardin, French actor
Robin Tunney, American actress
June 23 – Selma Blair, American actress
June 28 – Alessandro Nivola, American actor
July 3 - Matt Schulze, American actor and musician
July 5 – Gilles Lellouche, French actor and director
July 7 - Heather Kafka, American actress
July 10
Christoph Hochhäusler, German film director and screenwriter
Peter Serafinowicz, English actor, comedian, director and screenwriter
Sofia Vergara, Colombian American actress, television producer, presenter and model
John Viener, American actor, voice actor, writer and comedian
July 11 - Michael Rosenbaum, American actor, director, producer, singer and comedian
July 12 – Nenad Jezdić, Serbian actor
July 15 – Scott Foley, American actor, director and screenwriter
July 23 - Marlon Wayans, American actor, comedian, writer and producer
July 27 – Maya Rudolph, American actress and comedian
July 28 – Elizabeth Berkley, American actress
July 29
Ato Essandoh, American actor
Wil Wheaton, American actor
August 1 - Guri Weinberg, Israeli-American actor and writer
August 2 - Jacinda Barrett, Australian-American actress
August 5 - Darren Shahlavi, English actor, martial artist and stuntman (d. 2015)
August 13 - Michael Sinterniklaas, French voice actor
August 15 – Ben Affleck, American actor, director and writer
August 30 – Cameron Diaz, American actress
September 4 - Carlos Ponce, Puerto Rican actor, musician, model and television personality
September 6
Dylan Bruno, American actor
Idris Elba, English actor
Mait Malmsten, Estonian actor
Anika Noni Rose, American actress and singer
September 7 – Matthew Sleeth, Australian director
September 8 
Giovanni Frezza, Italian child actor
Tomokazu Seki, Japanese voice actor
September 9 – Goran Visnjic, Croatian-American actor
September 15 - John Schwab, American actor
September 16
Mike Doyle (actor), American actor
Alex Rice, Aboriginal-Canadian actress
September 21 - Erin Fitzgerald, Canadian voice actress
September 24 - Finty Williams, English actress
September 27 – Gwyneth Paltrow, American actress
October 5 - Tom Hooper, British-Australian filmmaker
October 8
Enrique Arce, Spanish actor
Tricia Vessey, American actress, writer and producer
October 15 - Matt Keeslar, American former actor
October 17 – Eminem, American rapper and actor
October 18 - Christopher Knights, English voice actor, editor and cinematographer
October 20 - Thor Freudenthal, German director, screenwriter, animator and special effects artist
October 21 - Masakazu Morita, Japanese actor, voice actor and singer
October 22 – Saffron Burrows, English-American actress
October 23 - Kate del Castillo, Mexican-American actress
October 29 - Gabrielle Union, American actress, voice artist, activist and author
October 30
David Wilson Barnes, American actor
Jessica Hynes, English actress, director and writer
November 1
Toni Collette, Australian actress, producer and singer-songwriter
Jenny McCarthy, American actress
November 6 
Thandiwe Newton, English actress
Rebecca Romijn, American actress
November 7
Christopher Daniel Barnes, American actor and writer
Jeremy and Jason London, American actors
November 9 - Eric Dane, American actor
November 10 - Trevor Devall, Canadian voice actor and podcaster
November 11 - Adam Beach, Canadian actor
November 13 - Takuya Kimura, Japanese actor, singer and radio personality
November 14 – Josh Duhamel, American actor
November 16 - Michael Irby, American actor
November 19 - Sandrine Holt, British-born Canadian actress
November 21 - Rain Phoenix, American actress, musician and singer
November 26 – Arjun Rampal, Indian actor
November 29 - Brian Baumgartner, American actor
December 4 - Yūko Miyamura, Japanese actress and voice actress
December 7 – Jennifer Syme, American entertainment industry employee (d. 2001)
December 14
Jason Barry, Irish actor
Miranda Hart, English actress, comedian and writer
December 15 – Stuart Townsend, Irish actor
December 16 - Lisa Spoonauer, American former character actress (d. 2017)
December 18 - Jason Mantzoukas, American character actor, comedian, writer and podcaster.
December 19 – Alyssa Milano, American actress
December 20 - Marc Silk, English voice actor
December 23 – Christian Potenza, Canadian actor and voice actor
December 24 – Carmen Moore, Canadian actress
December 26 – Shane Meadows, English independent film director
December 29 – Jude Law, English actor

Deaths

 Film debuts 
Anne Archer – The HonkersWilliam Atherton – The New CenturionsMargaret Avery – Cool BreezeNed Beatty – DeliveranceJerry Bruckheimer (producer) – The Culpepper Cattle Co.Robert Carradine – The CowboysDominic Chianese – FuzzCandy Clark – Fat CityRonny Cox – DeliveranceBlythe Danner – To Kill a ClownPeter Firth – Brother Sun, Sister MoonJodie Foster – Napoleon and SamanthaJackie Earle Haley – The Outside ManBob Hoskins – Up the FrontIsabelle Huppert –  Faustine et le Bel ÉtéSamuel L. Jackson – Together for DaysMadeline Kahn - What's Up, Doc?Ben Kingsley – Fear Is the KeyEd Lauter - Dirty Little BillyJohn Lithgow – Dealing: Or the Berkeley-to-Boston Forty-Brick Lost-Bag BluesDavid Margulies - Scarecrow in a Garden of CucumbersSteve Martin – Another Nice MessFrank McRae – Cool BreezeBrian Doyle-Murray – FuzzNick Nolte – Dirty Little BillyJürgen Prochnow – ZoffFrank Sivero – The GodfatherStellan Skarsgård – Strandhugg i somrasJeffrey Tambor – The Summertime KillerLily Tomlin – Scarecrow in a Garden of CucumbersJames Woods – The VisitorsGeorge Wyner – Lady Sings the Blues''

See also 
 List of Hong Kong films of 1972

References

 
Film by year